Gabriel Luke Reid (born 24 February 1969) is a New Zealand actor, director, screenwriter and producer working in television, film and theatre. His doctoral thesis examines the impact of digital technologies on film production.

Education

Reid holds a PhD in Film, Television and Media Studies from the University of Auckland. His thesis titled The impact of digital technologies on feature film production presents a history of digital film production technologies as they have been developed and applied, primarily in the mainstream American cinema. It includes case studies of The Lord of the Rings and The Chronicles of Narnia, interpreted as instances of film making that are at once consequential for the development of digital production techniques and as ambiguously positioned between the local (N.Z.) and the global. Other case studies centre on projects for which all images are computer generated (i.e. animated feature films) and projects for which live action images are captured digitally. Reid conducted research at renowned studios and visual effects companies including Animal Logic, Blue Sky Studios, Industrial Light & Magic, Park Road Post, Pixar and Weta Digital. His interviewees included Andrew Adamson, Matt Aitken, Pete Docter, Bill George, Donald McAlpine, Tim Johnson, Barrie M. Osborne, Chris Wedge and Dean Wright.

Prior to securing his doctorate, Reid earned a Bachelor of Arts and Master of Arts (First Class Honours). His MA thesis, supervised by Professor MacDonald P. Jackson, examines film adaptations of works by Shakespeare. Conducting research at the Royal Shakespeare Company, Royal National Theatre and Renaissance Films, Reid interviewed notable directors, actors and producers, including John Barton, Hugh Cruttwell, Adrian Noble, Trevor Nunn, David Parfitt and Imogen Stubbs.

Dr Reid has lectured on Film History and New Zealand Cinema at Unitec Institute of Technology.

Career

As a grandson of Mercury Theatre founder Professor John Reid, Reid's interest in the performing arts was nurtured from an early age. Before hitting his teens, he secured representation with New Zealand's first professional talent agency, founded by former wrestler Robert Bruce. Reid acted on stage and television alongside such stalwarts as Deryck Guyler, George Henare and Billy T. James. At Auckland Grammar he was president of the Senior Film Society and a member of Bel Canto choir, led by David Hamilton. At sixteen he directed a season of Godspell and, years later, his work as a theatre director was garnering excellent reviews. Of his production of Amadeus, The New Zealand Herald wrote: "The multi-talented Mr Reid...directs with scrupulous care and refreshing confidence." Reviewing his production of The Crucible, The Strip magazine wrote: "Gabriel Reid is a clever, tightly disciplined, diligent director, with a bold and clear eye for design. This totally satisfying production coaxed new subtleties from the script — which could become far too dramatic for its own good in the hands of a less questioning director — yet diluted none of its power. It was craft and precision that fused this production into an example which could inspire even more experienced directors."

As vice-chair of Theatre Workshop, Reid oversaw productions of Salome, The Revenger's Tragedy and As You Like It, which featured Brown Nation star Rajeev Varma, writer-director Toa Fraser and actor-director Oliver Driver. Soon after, he was invited to join the staff of Auckland Metropolitan Opera (now known as New Zealand Opera) for the company's inaugural production, Die Fledermaus starring Dame Malvina Major at the newly opened Aotea Centre. Over a period of years he worked on numerous opera seasons. These productions featured such renowned artists as Dame Kiri Te Kanawa and Sir Donald McIntyre. Subsequently, Reid was an assistant director and production assistant on notable television and film projects, including Hercules: The Legendary Journeys, Bridge to Terabithia, The Chronicles of Narnia and Kiwi Christmas. As an actor he has appeared in television series and films, including Shortland Street, Street Legal, Jackson's Wharf, Outrageous Fortune, We're Here To Help and American Playboy: The Hugh Hefner Story.

His 2004 short film, As Dreams Are Made On starring Raymond Hawthorne, was invited to screen at Rhode Island International Film Festival, Melbourne International Film Festival and the New Zealand International Film Festival. His 2015 short film, Every Moment, won four awards at Tropfest N.Z., including Best Film and Best Actress (Bree Peters). Reid and his writing partner, Maile Daugherty, were awarded Best Short Film Screenplay at the New Zealand Writers Guild Awards, the SWANZ. The short was nominated in three categories at the New Zealand Film Awards. In 2019 the New Zealand Film Commission made Reid a recipient of Catalyst He Kauahi; a substantial grant facilitating feature film development via the production of high-end, narrative shorts. The grant was applied to Impossible, written and directed by Reid, produced by Belindalee Hope and Karpal Singh, starring Paul Norell and Diamond Langi. Post-produced at Sir Peter Jackson's Park Road Post, the film was mixed by two-time Academy Award winner Michael Hedges.

In 1999 Reid founded Pageant Films. The company has produced several thousand promos and numerous industry-acclaimed campaigns for New Zealand's largest television broadcasters; TVNZ, MediaWorks and their subsidiary networks (TV One, TV2, TVNZ6, TVNZ7, TVNZ Heartland, TV3 and C4). Reid's work has earned nominations at PromaxBDA Australia, winning Gold in 2010, and has featured some of New Zealand's most notable artists, including Temuera Morrison, Karl Urban, Robyn Malcolm, Angela Bloomfield and Oscar Kightley. Pageant is developing a slate of feature film projects including adaptations of classic works, the Wall Street drama Division, executive produced by David Parfitt and Matthew Metcalfe, and the romantic dramedy Misspelt, for which the producing team includes Andrew Adamson and Mark Johnson.

Commencing in 2012, Dr Reid served ten years on the board of the Directors and Editors Guild of Aotearoa New Zealand, including two terms as vice president. Commencing in 2017, he served five years on the board of Film Auckland Inc. On occasion, he has discussed in the media the state of the New Zealand screen industry.

References

External links
 
 As Dreams Are Made On at the Internet Movie Database 
 Every Moment at the Internet Movie Database 
 Impossible at the Internet Movie Database 
 Gabriel Reid at the Directors and Editors Guild of New Zealand 
 Gabriel Reid at AboutMe.com 

1969 births
Living people
People educated at Auckland Grammar School
New Zealand male stage actors
New Zealand male television actors
New Zealand male film actors
University of Auckland alumni